San Antonio Christian School, SACS for short, is a private, non-denominational Christian school in San Antonio, Texas.  It was established in 1972 to provide a Christ-centered, college preparatory education (grades PK-12).  It is accredited by the Association of Christian Schools International and the Southern Association of Colleges and Schools.

SACS competes in the Texas Association of Private and Parochial Schools as a 6A school in Division 1.

References

External links 
 San Antonio Christian School website

1972 establishments in Texas
Christian schools in Texas
Schools in San Antonio
High schools in San Antonio
Private K-12 schools in Texas
Educational institutions established in 1972